Have You Been Paying Attention? (abbreviated on social media as HYBPA? and stylised on-screen as Have you been paying attention? in sentence case) is an Australian panel game television quiz show on Network 10. The series, which is produced by Working Dog Productions, is a mix of news and comedy which sees host Tom Gleisner quiz five guests (of whom Ed Kavalee and Sam Pang are permanent panellists) on the week's top news stories.

Despite a disappointing start in ratings, and initially a change in timeslot and format, the series has proven to be a consistent performer for Network Ten, having its ratings increase with successive seasons and receiving critical acclaim. The show won two Logies in 2017 for Best Entertainment Program and Most Outstanding Entertainment Program, one in 2018 for Most Popular Comedy Program, two in 2019 for Most Outstanding Entertainment Program and for Most Popular Comedy Program and one in 2022 for Most Popular Comedy Program.

Format
The series sees the host ask guests a range of news-related questions. In turn, guests frequently give humorous or satirical answers, but only correct answers are awarded points. The series has also become known for its banter between its serious moderator and its not as serious contestants. In addition to questions regarding the previous week's events, the contestants are also quizzed in various other games. Generally, two of these segments are played in each episode.

Regular segments
General questions: News events from the past week which can be grouped into the categories of Showbiz or Sport.
Guest Quizmasters: Once (occasionally twice) an episode, a guest quizmaster (often a sportsperson or TV personality) joins to ask a series of questions, usually related to the guest in some way.
Animal News: News events (often amusing) featuring animals.
Individual test: Each contestant is asked an individual question, often with two possible answers.  
Rapid Recall: This is the final round and segment of the show and sees contestants required to answer as quickly as possible as the segment is timed. This is the only segment during the show where the scores are not readily shown.

Individual tests
Each episode includes a segment where contestants are each asked an individual question.  A wide variety of games have been used, including:
Over or Under: Each contestant individually watches a clip from RBT and must guess if the person is "over or under" the legal blood-alcohol limit (0.05g, as per Australian law).
Trash or Treasure: Each contestant individually watches a clip from Antiques Roadshow and must guess if the item the person has is worth under £1000 (trash) or is worth over £1000 (treasure).
Going, Going, Gone: A series of questions about famous items being sold over the past week and contestants must answer what it is famous for, or which famous person used or owned it.
Either/Or: The original variation of the above three and is used primarily to test the contestants' understanding of complicated (or amusing) names in the news. Many versions of this game have been developed, such as Rapper or Restaurant / Oui or Non / Tennis Player or IKEA Furniture etc.).
Binge This: Contestants are shown short clips from various online streaming service programs, and must determine what happens next in each scenario. These are often in a foreign language and have unexpected twists. 
The Bold and the Beautiful: Each contestant is shown a clip from the long-running American soap and has to predict what happens next. 
Identify These International Versions of Well Known Reality TV Formats: Each contestant individually watches a short clip (and often a clip that appears weird context) from an international version of a well known reality television format. Contestants are awarded 10 points for correctly guessing the format and 10 points if they can guess the country the clip is from (e.g., if a clip from the Israeli version of Survivor was shown, a contestant would receive 10 points for answering Survivor and/or 10 points for answering Israel).

Episodes

Cast

Host
 Tom Gleisner

Guest Host
 Jane Kennedy (4 episodes)
 Dr. Chris Brown (1 episode)
 Chrissie Swan (4 episodes)
 Hayley Sproull (1 episode)

Guests

Production and broadcast
The series was first commissioned by Network Ten on 25 October 2013, with the first season to consist of eight episodes which would air over the final four weeks of ratings season and first four weeks of summer ratings.

In February 2014, it was reported in an interview with host and co-executive producer Tom Gleisner that Network Ten had given the series an "open-ended" run for its 2014 season. The second season premiered on 23 February 2014 in the new timeslot of 6pm Sunday. On 9 April 2014, part way through the second season, it was announced that the show would be moved from the 6pm Sunday timeslot to 9.30pm Monday, and expanded to a one-hour format. The later timeslot would allow the series to include more adult themes. Following a six-week hiatus, the show returned on Monday 19 May 2014. Beginning on 14 July, season two moved an hour earlier to 8:30pm as a result of the low ratings of 24: Live Another Day which previously occupied the timeslot.

On 29 September 2014, it was reported that a Year in Review special had been commissioned which would air later in the year. The special aired on 17 November 2014, reviewing the top news stories of the past 12 months. The special saw the introduction of guest quizmasters to the format, which have since become a recurring feature of the series.

On 14 November 2014, the series was renewed for a third season, which premiered on 11 May 2015.

A second Year in Review special aired following the third season, premiering on 23 November 2015.

On 26 October 2015, the series was renewed for a fourth season, which premiered on 9 May 2016. In October 2016, part of the set was revamped to include illuminating buzzers and minor changes in graphics.

A 2016 Year in Review special premiered on 21 November 2016.

In October 2018, Working Dog Productions agreed with Ten Network Holdings to sell international rights to the format to the network's parent company, CBS Studios International.

Filming
The series is filmed at Network Ten studios in South Yarra, Melbourne in front of a live studio audience. The series was originally filmed on a Saturday, but successive seasons saw filming moved from Mondays to Sundays. Filming the day prior to airing, the series aims to be as current as possible. When the show aired at 6pm on Sundays, multiple endings were filmed in case the removal of inappropriate or potentially offensive answers resulted in a different winner during post-production.

Impact of the COVID–19 pandemic on Season 8 (2020)

In 2020, due to the ongoing COVID-19 pandemic, Season 8 was recorded with only Gleisner and a handful of production crew filming the show from the South Yarra studio, with all of the contestants working from home and video conferencing in to enforce social distancing. There was also no live studio audience.

International versions
Paramount Global Distribution Group (formally CBS Studios International and owned by Network 10 parent Paramount Global) owns the format for international distribution, their first non-United States format for distribution internationally.

New Zealand

A New Zealand version, Have You Been Paying Attention? New Zealand, first aired on 24 July 2019 on TVNZ 2, hosted by Hayley Sproull, starring comedian and HYBPA? Australia regular Urzila Carlson and ZM radio host Vaughan Smith.

Cyprus
In September 2020, it was announced the format rights had been sold to Cyprus, marking it as the second international sale of the format. The Cypriot version of the show is titled ΔΩΣΕ ΒΑΣΗ!, which translates to PAY ATTENTION!.

Awards and nominations

|-
|rowspan="2"|2016
|rowspan="2"|Logie Awards of 2016
|Best Entertainment Program
|rowspan="9"|Have You Been Paying Attention?
|
|rowspan="2"|
|-
|Most Outstanding Entertainment Program
|
|-
|rowspan="2"|2017
|rowspan="2"|Logie Awards of 2017
|Best Entertainment Program
|
|rowspan="2"|
|-
|Most Outstanding Entertainment Program
|
|-
|2018
|Logie Awards of 2018
|Most Popular Comedy Program
|
|
|-
|rowspan="2"|2019
|rowspan="2"|Logie Awards of 2019
|Most Popular Comedy Program
|
|rowspan="2"|
|-
|Most Outstanding Entertainment Program
|
|-
|2021
|TV Blackbox Awards
|rowspan=2|Most Popular Comedy Program
|
|
|-
|2022
|Logie Awards of 2022
| 
|

Controversy
The series came under criticism as a result of jokes relating to the death of King of Thailand Bhumibol Adulyadej during the episode airing on 17 October 2016 (Season 4 Episode 23). As a result, Network Ten issued a formal apology to Thailand's Ambassador to Australia Chirachai Punkrasin, and the footage in question was removed from Network Ten's website, social media, and was removed from the episode for future broadcasts.

See also
 List of longest-running Australian television series

References

External links
 
 

2010s Australian game shows
2020s Australian game shows
2013 Australian television series debuts
Australian panel games
English-language television shows
Network 10 original programming
Television shows set in Melbourne